The Face of an Angel is a 2014 British psychological thriller directed by Michael Winterbottom and written by Paul Viragh. The film was inspired by the book Angel Face, drawn from crime coverage by Newsweek/Daily Beast writer Barbie Latza Nadeau. The film stars Kate Beckinsale, Daniel Brühl, and Cara Delevingne.

The film is based on the real-life story of the murder of Meredith Kercher in 2007.

Cast

Production
The Face of an Angel was executively produced by Eric Anidjar, Leon Benarroch, Andrew Eaton, Jordan Gertner, Susana Hornil, Anthony Jabre, Christine Langan, Norman Merry, Roberto Mitrani, Reza Safinia, and Ed Wethered.

On 6 September 2013, Daniel Brühl joined the film to lead the cast. On 10 October 2013, Cara Delevingne joined the cast of the film. On 14 October 2013, Kate Beckinsale was set to join the drama film.

Principal photography began in mid-November 2013 in Siena, Italy. On 3 February 2014, WestEnd Films showed the first promo-reel to the buyers at European Film Market in Berlin International Film Festival, when the film was in post-production.

Reception
The film received negative reviews. , the film holds a 37% approval rating on Rotten Tomatoes, based on 51 reviews with an average score of 5.1/10. The website's critics consensus reads: "The Face of an Angel finds director Michael Winterbottom in pursuit of ideas that remain frustratingly diffuse and agonizingly out of his grasp."

References

External links
 
 

2014 films
2010s psychological drama films
2014 psychological thriller films
British psychological drama films
British psychological thriller films
Italian psychological drama films
Italian psychological thriller films
Spanish drama films
Spanish psychological thriller films
2010s English-language films
Films directed by Michael Winterbottom
Films set in Italy
Films set in Siena
Films shot in Italy
Thriller films based on actual events
Films à clef
2014 drama films
2010s British films
2010s Spanish films
2010s Italian films
English-language Italian films
English-language Spanish films